Massu Engira Masilamani, also known by its former title Masss, is a 2015 Indian Tamil-language action horror comedy film directed by Venkat Prabhu. The film was produced by K. E. Gnanavel Raja under his Studio Green banner alongside his then-newly formed studio Aadnah Arts, and was distributed by Eros International and Dream factory. The film features an ensemble cast including Suriya, Nayanthara, Pranitha Subhash, Premji, Parthiban and Samuthirakani. Yuvan Shankar Raja composed the film's soundtrack and score, whereas cinematography and editing were handled by R. D. Rajasekhar and Praveen K. L. respectively.

The film was launched in April 2014, and the principal photography was commenced in July 2014 and completed in April 2015. Filming took place in various locations of India and Bulgaria. The film's title Masss, was announced in July 2014, however in order to receive exemption from entertainment tax, the film's title was changed to Massu Engira Masilamani.

The film was released worldwide on 29 May 2015. A Telugu dubbed version, titled Rakshasudu, was released simultaneously in Andhra Pradesh and Telangana. It is remade into Bengali as Naqaab.

Plot
Former Police Commissioner Shanmuga Sundaram, is murdered by a released prisoner named Kamal Ekambaram. The story then shifts to Masilamani alias Masss and his friend Jettu who are small-time con artists. Masss meets Manini, a nurse, and they subsequently fall in love. While trying to escape after a heist gone wrong, Masss and Jettu met with a car accident, post which Masss starts seeing dead people, with whom he can communicate. Jettu dies in the accident and is now a ghost, too. Masss forms a group of loitering ghosts to earn money by performing fake exorcisms and extorting money from scared, rich people, while promising the ghosts that he would fulfill their last wishes in return. Meanwhile, Manini, who thought Masss was working in a finance company, gets to know about the fake exorcisms and leaves him in his plots.

One day, Masss meets a ghost called Shakthivel (Shakthi), a Sri Lankan Tamil man from Ceylon and a lookalike of Masss. Shakthi initially seems to help Masss to pull off a large heist. However, he wants to use Masss for his own needs. He sabotages the plan and tricks Masss into running over Anthony Xavier, a hawala broker. Corrupt ACP Vikram Lakshman takes charge to investigate the case and learns that Masss is somehow involved in the murder. Meanwhile, the ghosts start striking against Masss as they assume that he is just making use of them and would cheat later on. Masss yells at them and orders them to leave. Just then, Shakthi arrives upon the request of the ghosts. They leave with Shakthi, while Jettu manages to convince Masss.  Masss agrees and fulfills the wishes of the ghosts where they attain salvation,  which makes him a better person. All these good deeds of Masss, change Manini's assumptions on him positively.

Meanwhile, Shakthi manages to use Masss to kill another person, Madhivadhanan (Madhi), an Member of Legislative Assembly (MLA) and associate of Anthony. While Masss is furious with Shakthi for having made him a double murderer, Kamal meets Masss and starts telling him about Shakthi's past whereby Masss learns that he is in fact Shakthi's son. Shakthi was a cop in Quebec City, Canada, who married Anuradha (Anu), a teacher in his daughter Megha's school, just for Megha's wish. Shakthi secretly learned that Anu really loves and takes care of Megha. Soon, they both fell in love, and Anu gave birth to a son (Masss). Anu owns an acre of land in India, which she wanted to donate to an orphanage, where a new orphanage could be built there. Kamal, who was the only family-friend of Anu in India agreed to help with the registration. Shakthi and Anu, along with Megha and infant Masss, arrived at India to complete the registration, but learn that Industrialists Radha Krishnan aka R. K, along with Anthony forged documents and planned to take the land away to construct flats. Since Shakthi remained undeterred and did not give way, R. K., Anthony, Madhi and Sundaram, along with their henchman killed Shakthi, Anu, and Megha and pinned the murders on Kamal for which he was imprisoned for all these years. Masss survived because Megha had left him safe in a small house of a poor family nearby.

Through Masss, Shakthi wanted to kill all the people who were responsible for his family's demise. Knowing the truth, Masss decides to kill the last person, R. K, himself. R. K. knowing who Masss is, tries to kill him, but Kamal saves Masss. However, because Masss being hit on the head by R. K., loses the ability to see and converse with the spirits any further. With the help of Vikram, who was bribed by Masss to double-cross R. K. Masss finally kills R. K. As Shakthi's last wish is fulfilled, he obtains salvation and joins Anu and Megha in heaven. Manini reunites with Masss, and they get married, but Jettu remains on earth

Cast

 Suriya in a dual role as Masilamani, alias "Masss", a con artist man with a supernatural ability to see and communicate with ghosts, and Shakthivel (Shakthi),  a Sri Lankan Tamil man from Ceylon, a Canadian based police officer in Montreal, Quebec, and Masss's father
 Nayanthara as Manini, a nurse, Masss's love interest later wife, who leaves him after discovering he was cheating people but later after knowing his good deeds reconciles with him (Voice Dubbed By Renuka Kathir)
 Pranitha Subhash as Anuradha "Anu", Shakthi's wife, Masss's mother, and Megha's teacher and stepmother who died saving Megha and infant Masss.
 Premji as Jet Li "Jettu", Masss's best friend who dies in an accident and becomes a ghost
 R. Parthiban as ACP Vikram Lakshman lPS, a corrupt police officer from Sembikkarai who investigates the case and double-crosses R. K.
 Riyaz Khan as Kamal Ekambaram, Anu's family friend and an escaped prisoner who reveals Shakthi's past to Masss
 Samuthirakani as Radha Krishnan "R. K.", a real estate owner and the main antagonist who, along with his accomplices, kills Shakthi, Anu, and Megha
 Sharath Lohitashwa as Anthony Xavier, R. K.'s partner and a hawala broker
 Charles Vinoth as MLA Madhivadhanan "Madhi", R. K. and Anthony's henchman
 Subbu Panchu as Police Commissioner Shanmuga Sundaram, R. K. and Anthony's henchman who gets murdered by Kamal
 Jayaprakash as Kothandaram Reddy
 Aravind Akash as Anthony's henchman
 Yuvina Parthavi as Megha, Shakthi's daughter, Masss's half sister 
 Karunas as Azhagu (ghost)
 Sriman as Salesman Sripathy (ghost)
 Rethika Srinivas as Padma (ghost)
 Jasper as Chinna (ghost)
 Rajendran as a ghost
 Sanjay Bharathi as a ghost
 Daniel Annie Pope as a ghost
 Shanmugasundaram as a ghost
 V. Gnanavel as a ghost
 Hareeni Nair as a ghost
 Susheela Neethi as a ghost
 Vidyullekha Raman as Julie, Manini's friend and colleague in the hospital
 Brahmanandam as Dr. Gnanaprakasham, Hospital Dean
 Madhusudhan Rao as Reddy
 Sonia as Gnanaprakasham's wife
 Manobala as Arnold
 Stunt Silva as Prince, Reddy's henchman
 Prinz Nithik as Mahesh, Madhi's henchman
 Ramya Subramanian as Reporter
 Badava Gopi as Registrar
 Ramya Ramakrishnan as Ramya
 Vikramadithyan as Siddhar
 Srilekha Rajendran as Orphanage Caretaker

Cameo appearances
 Jai as Kathiresan (ghost), Ganesh's eye-donor 
 Vijay Vasanth as Drinker at Bar
 Anjali as Manimegalai (archival footage from Engeyum Eppothum)
 Vaibhav as Ghost
 Sangeetha Krish as S. Shankari, Shakthi's School Principal

Production

Development
In early December 2013, Sify reported that Venkat Prabhu's next film after Biriyani (2013) would feature Suriya as the male lead and would also be produced by the actor himself under his newly launched company 2D Entertainment. Three days later the project was confirmed by the director, who however clarified that Studio Green would co-produce it along with 2D Entertainment. Subsequently, lyricist Madhan Karky was signed to write the dialogues for the film. As with Prabhu's earlier films, composer Yuvan Shankar Raja and editor Praveen K. L. were added to the technical crew, while R. D. Rajasekhar was signed as the cinematographer, replacing Prabhu's usual cinematographer Sakthi Saravanan. The film was touted to be the first Tamil film to be shot in 3D from the beginning, but Venkat Prabhu later informed that it was not true. It was reported to be a horror comedy, while Venkat Prabhu stated that he was "trying something new" and that he could not reveal the genre. The film was rumoured to be titled as Poochandi, however Venkat Prabhu announced on 5 July 2014 via Twitter and Facebook that it had been titled Masss. On 25 May 2015, the film was renamed with a Tamil title Massu Engira Masilamani, to be exempted from the State Government's thirty percentage entertainment tax.

Casting
Reports in January 2014 indicated that Suriya would be playing a dual role in the film. Further more, he was said to be given two different looks, one of them having him sport long hair. After completing the film, Suriya stated that he had played two characters, Masilamani, a conman, and Shakti. Venkat Prabhu went on to add that Shakti was a Sri Lankan Tamil. Nayanthara was signed to play one of the female leads along with Amy Jackson, while the director's brother Premji was given a significant supporting role as in all of Prabhu's films. Mohan was reported to be playing the villain, but the director stated that Mohan was not approached for any role in the film. Actor-director R. Parthiepan informed that he had "a special character to essay in Masss, a very significant one". In August 2014, the Times of India reported that Jayaram, who had worked with Venkat Prabhu in Saroja (2008), had been added to the cast and would be playing a prominent role, however, he was replaced by Parthiban. Actors Sriman, Karunas and Daniel Annie Pope of Idharkuthane Aasaipattai Balakumara (2013) fame were reported to be playing the roles of spirits in the film. On 10 August 2014, actress Vidyullekha Raman informed that she would be a part of the project. The next day, actor-director Samuthirakani was announced to be part of the project. Sanjay Bharathi was given a supporting role and participated in the Hyderabad schedule.

In November 2014, Amy Jackson opted out of the project, explaining that the makers had changed her character and the script, which would have resulted in her shooting only for half the number of days than she was initially committed to. She was replaced by Pranitha Subhash who joined the film's cast later the month. In October 2014, Riyaz Khan was named to be a part of the film, and was said to be playing "a very important role with a unique characterization". Prinz stated that he played one of the villains in Masss and that he would appear for a short duration but share screen space with Suriya.

Filming
The film was officially launched with a puja ceremony on 14 April 2014, coinciding with Tamil New Year. Principal photography was reported to start from 11 July 2014, but commenced three days earlier in Chennai. The first schedule was shot in a house on the ECR stretch for 15 days. The crew with Suriya and Nayanthara shot some scenes at a hospital in Chennai. The first and second schedules of the film were completed by early September 2014. The team reportedly continued filming in Ooty, Kerala and Kullu-Manali in North India. Forty per cent of the filming was completed by the end of September 2014. In November 2014, the first song was filmed, which was choreographed by Ajay Raaj. By early December, the team shot crucial portions including a duet song sequence involving Suriya and Pranitha in Bulgaria. Following the schedule in Bulgaria, filming continued in Puducherry by January 2015. Later, the makers completed the film's principal photography on 20 April 2015.

Music

The film's soundtrack album features seven tracks composed by Yuvan Shankar Raja, with two instrumentals and a remix done by Premgi Amaren. The lyrics for the songs were written by Gangai Amaran, Madhan Karky and Viveka. Yuvan Shankar Raja began working on the film's music in August 2014 and stated that the soundtrack would be "completely wacky". In November 2014, Tanvi Shah had recorded a song for the soundtrack, which was however, not featured in the album. At an award function later that month, the composer told that he was working on a special track that would be a tribute to Michael Jackson and be on the lines of Jackson's "Thriller", later revealed to be "Poochandi".

In March 2015, Sify reported that Yuvan Shankar Raja was no longer part of the project and that he had been replaced by S. Thaman as the film's composer, who will also hold for the film's background score. Venkat Prabhu denied the news, and Yuvan Shankar Raja later clarified that, because of time constraints, he composed a tune and gave it to Thaman to work on the orchestration part only, since the team needed to finish the shoot quickly.

The film's soundtrack was initially scheduled to be released in April 2015. Raja submitted the master copy of the album on 24 April 2015. The album was released online on various streaming platforms, without hosting any audio launch. The songs were aired live through FM stations, on the day of the launch.

Thaman had remixed the tune of the song "Gandi Baat" from the Hindi film R... Rajkumar (2013), which was titled as "Sema Masss" in Tamil and "Super Masss" in Telugu. The song was included in the film's Telugu version, but not featured in the Tamil album altogether. However, it was separately and officially uploaded in YouTube, and also as a bonus track, after the film's release.

Tamil version

Telugu version

The soundtrack for the Telugu version of the film titled as Rakshasudu, was released on 14 May 2015. The launch was coincided with a grand event held at Hyderabad, with Nagarjuna, S. S. Rajamouli and Prabhas attending the event as chief guests. The additional track of the film "Sema Masss", in Telugu titled as "Super Masss", composed by S. Thaman, was included in the film's soundtrack album.Reception

The soundtrack received positive reviews from critics. Behindwoods rated the soundtrack 3.25 out of 5 and said "The successful combination of Venkat Prabhu & Yuvan Shankar Raja strike again, this time with more experimentation and vivacity!" Indiaglitz gave it 3 out of 5 and said, "To quote YSR, the album is 'completely wacky'. Promise of surprise element – check, tribute to Michael Jackson – check, high energy – check... This album is a reviving, soulful and definitely a chart-topper material". Bollywoodlife gave the soundtrack 3 stars out of 5 stating "Yuvan's album has one or two standout numbers like Therikkudhu Masss and Piravi which will stay with you even after a while you are done listening. As for the rest, the songs are not so special or different that would make for an interesting album." Milliblog commented "Masss is the weakest soundtrack among all Venkat Prabhu-Yuvan combos." Moviecrow gave 2.75 out of 5 to the album and stated This album provides the right amount of coolness one would expect from a Yuvan Shankar Raja-Venkat Prabhu collaboration, but it just doesn't pull off the "awe" that these two have been providing all over the years. Not the powerhouse we wanted, but definitely the fun we needed."

Release 
The film was initially scheduled to release in March 2015. However the makers officially announced that the film would be released on 1 May 2015. Later, the makers have postponed the release to avoid clash with Kamal Haasan's Uttama Villain. On mid-April 2015, the makers confirmed that the film would be released on 15 May 2015. However, to avoid clash with Jyothika's 36 Vayadhinile, which was also produced by Suriya, the makers pushed the release to 29 May 2015.

The film was released in around 1900 screens worldwide, including 425 screens in Tamil Nadu, 570 screens in Andhra Pradesh and Telangana, 143 screens in Kerala, 100 screens in Karnataka, 140 screens in North India and nearly 600 plus screens in overseas territories, thus becoming the biggest release in Suriya's career.

Marketing 
Dream Factory, a subsidiary of Studio Green was confirmed to distribute the film in Tamil Nadu. Sopnam Films bought the Kerala distribution rights for Masss as well as two other Studio Green productions, Komban and Darling. The rights to Karnataka region were sold to distributor Srikanth.

The first poster of Masss was released on 22 October 2014, coinciding with the Deepavali festival. The official teaser was released on 25 April 2015 after midnight.

Reception

Critical reception
Upon release, Behindwoods gave the film 3.5 stars out of 5 and said, "It has the expected Venkat Prabhu elements, the crowd-pleasing supernatural factors treated in a slightly different way and of course, Suriya in all his glory." International Business Times also awarded the film 3.5 stars and said, "One thing obvious throughout the film is the effort taken by the director to make his movie watchable for audience  of all age groups. It has romance, some spooky elements, comedy, witty one-liners, action, songs and dance." Oneindia rated it 3 stars as well and wrote, "Thanks to Suriya's brilliant performance and Venkat Prabhu's intriguing story telling ability, Masss will surely be enjoyed by the masses albeit poor VFX hindering the quality of the movie." Indiaglitz gave 3 stars out of 5 too and stated, "Venkat Prabhu has been stereotyped as the director who loves party hard movies, a bit of adult humor and all that, but in Masss he has steered clear of those elements and has given a wholesome family entertainer with an interesting storyline." The Times of India also rated the film 3 out of 5 and added, "The film lacks the raciness of Biriyani or Mankatha, but there is enough inventiveness and joie de vivre to the scenes to keep us entertained."Sify rated 3.5 out of 5 and described Massu Engira Masilamani as "a no-holds-barred entertainer with all the essential ingredients." Rediff gave the film 3.5 stars on a scale of 5 and commented, "There is non-stop excitement, with all the characters in the film being on some kind of high, literally bursting with energy." Deccan Chronicle rated the film 3.5 out of 5 as well, saying that "the film drives up to an intersection where one sign says horror and another, entertainment, and firmly decides on the latter while paying just a passing reference to the former." The Economic Times also gave the film 3.5 stars and wrote, "The paranormal twist in Massu... is what keeps you interested but there are too many twists; some predictable and some good." Writing for The Hindu, Baradwaj Rangan stated, "The idea behind the supernaturally themed Massu is terrific, even it feels like a mashup of many spirit-driven films...the thing with Venkat Prabhu's films these days...(is)...they're all ideas and no follow-through...It's only in the last hour or so that Massu begins to score." Malini Mannath from The New Indian Express wrote, "Not very funny, not very scary, and not very original, Venkat Prabhu's attempt at crafting his first supernatural-comic-vendetta flick, turns out to be a disappointing and a boring affair...The director weaves in a hotchpotch of situations, the screenplay is sloppy and narration is jerky. The characters are one too many and the genuinely appreciative moments are few and far between."

Box office
Masss collected 16.5 crores on its first day in Tamil Nadu alone, where the collection of next two days were 4.90 crore and 75 crore taking its first weekend gross to 95 crore in Tamil Nadu and collected nearly 30 crores in Kerala on its first weekend. It collected 1 crore from Bangalore alone on its first day, the Telugu version Rakshasudu collected nearly 40 crore on its first two days in AP-Nizam centres.
The film grossed around  worldwide in its opening weekend, including  net in Tamil Nadu alone with 18.4 million from Chennai alone. From the overseas markets, it reportedly earned  in its first three days. The film has grossed approximately  worldwide from both Tamil and Telugu versions in its lifetime, not adding the entertainment tax in India.

Masss was listed as one of the top 10 highest-grossing Tamil films of the year.

References

External links 
 

2015 action comedy films
2015 comedy horror films
2010s supernatural thriller films
2010s Tamil-language films
2015 comedy films
2015 films
Fictional portrayals of the Tamil Nadu Police
Films directed by Venkat Prabhu
Films scored by Yuvan Shankar Raja
Films set in Quebec City
Films set in Tanzania
Films shot in Bulgaria
Films shot in Chennai
Films shot in Himachal Pradesh
Films shot in Kerala
Films shot in Ooty
Films shot in Puducherry
Indian action comedy films
Indian comedy horror films
Indian ghost films
Indian supernatural thriller films
Royal Canadian Mounted Police in fiction
Films scored by Thaman S
Tamil films remade in other languages